The VS-15 is a Brazilian sounding rocket.
It consists of a single, liquid fuel recoverable stage, based on the new L15 engine (with 15 kN of thrust).
It would mainly qualify the L15 engine in flight. The engine development project was canceled in 2013.

Characteristics
Thrust = 15 kN
ISP = 321s

References

Sounding rockets of Brazil
Space program of Brazil